Van Roosbroeck is a surname. Notable people with the surname include:

Eugène Van Roosbroeck (1928–2018), Belgian cyclist
Gustaaf Van Roosbroeck (born 1948), Belgian cyclist

Surnames of Dutch origin